Jericho is an unincorporated community in the town of Brothertown in Calumet County, Wisconsin, United States. Jericho is located at the intersection of County highways C & H. Jericho is part of the Holyland region in Wisconsin.

History
Jericho was settled in 1855 as a station on the plank road between Brothertown and Sheboygan. One of its first settlers was J. M. Parkins who constructed Sechter's Inn as one of the community's first buildings.

Images

References

Unincorporated communities in Wisconsin
Unincorporated communities in Calumet County, Wisconsin